Greg Rickford  (born September 24, 1967) is a Canadian politician. He is the Minister of Northern Development and Minister of Indigenous Affairs in the Executive Council of Ontario under Premier Doug Ford. He represents the Kenora-Rainy River riding in the Legislative Assembly of Ontario.

Rickford previously served as the federal Minister of Natural Resources and as the Minister of State for Science and Technology in the cabinet of Prime Minister Stephen Harper.  He was elected to the House of Commons in the 2008 federal election and represented the electoral district of Kenora as a member of the Conservative Party until his defeat  in the 2015 election.

Birth, nursing and law
Rickford was born in Paris, Ontario on September 24, 1967. He worked as a nurse and lawyer in the remote First Nations communities of the Kenora District.

Federal politics
Rickford was elected to represent the Ontario electoral district of Kenora in the 2008 federal election and re-elected in the 2011 election.

A member of the Conservative Party of Canada, Rickford was the first Conservative MP elected in the Kenora riding and the first right-wing MP to represent the Kenora area since 1921.

Prime Minister Stephen Harper appointed Rickford to become Parliamentary Secretary for Official Languages on August 30, 2010.

On January 30, 2011, Rickford was appointed Parliamentary Secretary to the Minister of Indian Affairs and Northern Development.

On July 15, 2013, he was appointed the Minister of State (Science and Technology, and Federal Economic Development Initiative for Northern Ontario).

On March 19, 2014, he was appointed to succeed Joe Oliver as Minister of Natural Resources.

He was defeated in the October 19, 2015 Canadian federal election by Bob Nault.  Nault had represented the predecessor riding of Kenora-Rainy River from 1988 until 2004, when he chose not to run in the 2004 Canadian federal election.  Rickford was pushed into third place, behind Nault and former Ontario New Democratic Party leader Howard Hampton.

Provincial politics
Rickford re-entered politics on November 18, 2017, when he was acclaimed as the Ontario PC Party candidate in Kenora—Rainy River for the 2018 election. The Progressive Conservatives won a majority government in the June 7, election and Rickford was elected in his riding.

On June 29, 2018, Rickford was appointed Ministry of Energy, Mines, Northern Development and Indigenous Affairs in the cabinet of Premier Doug Ford.

Electoral record

Cabinet positions

References

External links

1967 births
Conservative Party of Canada MPs
Living people
Members of the Executive Council of Ontario
Members of the 28th Canadian Ministry
Members of the House of Commons of Canada from Ontario
Members of the King's Privy Council for Canada
Sportspeople from the County of Brant
People from Kenora
Mining ministers of Canada
McGill University Faculty of Law alumni
Université Laval alumni
Progressive Conservative Party of Ontario MPPs